Gustavo Carbonieri Santa Rosa (born 4 March 1992) is a Brazilian professional footballer who plays as a centre-back for Italian club Casale.

Club career
Born in São Paulo, Carbonieri started his career with Série B team Salgueiro in 2011. After playing for a number of clubs in the lower divisions of Brazilian football, he returned to the second tier in 2014 with Bragantino. He scored his only goal for the club in a Copa do Brasil match against São Paulo.

In 2015, Carbonieri moved to Tombense in search of more first team opportunities. However he was loaned out to Portuguese club Santa Clara of the Segunda Liga where he managed to make 27 appearances. In June 2017, he joined Croatian club Hajduk Split on trial. During his trial, he played the whole 90 minute of a friendly against Zorya Luhansk. On 7 July, the club via a statement published in their website announced that they had signed Carbonieri. In September, he was successfully operated as he suffered a ventricular rupture and dislocation of left ankle. In May 2018 his contract was terminated with mutual consent.

References

External links 

Gustavo Carbonieri at Foradejogo

1992 births
Living people
Footballers from São Paulo
Brazilian footballers
Brazilian expatriate footballers
Expatriate footballers in Portugal
Brazilian expatriate sportspeople in Portugal
Expatriate footballers in Croatia
Brazilian expatriate sportspeople in Croatia
Expatriate footballers in Bulgaria
Brazilian expatriate sportspeople in Bulgaria
Expatriate footballers in Kosovo
Brazilian expatriate sportspeople in Kosovo
Association football defenders
Campeonato Brasileiro Série C players
Campeonato Brasileiro Série B players
Tombense Futebol Clube players
Salgueiro Atlético Clube players
Rio Branco Esporte Clube players
Central Sport Club players
Clube Atlético Penapolense players
Clube Atlético Bragantino players
Rio Preto Esporte Clube players
Liga Portugal 2 players
C.D. Santa Clara players
Croatian Football League players
HNK Hajduk Split players
First Professional Football League (Bulgaria) players
FC Tsarsko Selo Sofia players
Football Superleague of Kosovo players
KF Trepça'89 players